GMS may refer to:

Education 
 Gates Millennium Scholars Program, higher education scholarship program in the United States
 Glen Mills Schools, in Thornbury Township, Delaware County, Pennsylvania, United States
 Governor Morehead School, in Raleigh, North Carolina, United States
 Great Marlow School, in Buckinghamshire, England
 Noel Grisham Middle School, in the Anderson Mill community, Texas, United States

Medicine 
 General medical services, the contract under which NHS general practitioners work
 GMS syndrome, a genetic disorder

Science and technology 
 GMS (software), groundwater simulation software
 Geographic Messaging Service, a location-based mobile messaging service
 Geostationary Meteorological Satellite, a series of Japanese weather satellites
 Globalization management system, a type of software for automating human language translation
 Glycerol monostearate, a type of emulsifier
 Google Mobile Services, proprietary apps and services from Google bundled with Android devices
 Grocott's methenamine silver stain, histological stain used to identify fungi by staining of the cell walls
 Galvanized mild steel, a kind of prepainted metal

Other uses 
 GMS (music group), a Dutch psychedelic trance duo
 Global MapleStory, a multiplayer online role-playing game
 Good Morning Scotland, a Scottish breakfast radio news programme
 Greater Mekong Subregion, encompassing the Mekong River basin
 GMS Motorcycles, an English motorcycle designer
 GMS Racing, an American professional stock car racing team

See also 
 GM (disambiguation)